The Hong Kong Film Award for Best New Director is an annual Hong Kong industry award presented to a director who is considered the best of the year.

History

In 2002 the new category of Outstanding Young Director was created as a way to recognise up-and-coming directors, the first award was presented to Stephen Chow for his 2001 film Shaolin Soccer. Two years later at the 23rd Hong Kong Film Awards the award was renamed Best New Director and continues to be presented.

Winners and nominees

References

External links

Awards for best director
Awards established in 2002
Hong Kong Film Awards